Madurai Saurashtra Sundari Bai (2 March 1923 – 12 March 2006) was an Indian actress, singer and dancer who worked mainly in Tamil cinema from the 1940s to the 1970s. Sundari Bai was the wife of writer and director Kothamangalam Subbu. Her most notable films include Aadmi (1939), Madanakamarajan (1941), Nandanar (1942), Dasi Aparanji (1944), Kannamma En Kadhali (1945), Miss Malini (1947), Chandralekha (1948), Avvaiyyar (1953), Vanjikottai Valiban (1958), Deivapiravi (1960), Padikkadha Medhai (1960) and Sila Nerangalil Sila Manithargal (1976).

Biography
Sundari Bai was born in Madurai in 1923, and belonged to the Saurashtra community. A family friend persuaded her parents to send her to Bombay (now Mumbai). In the 1930s, she appeared in an advertisement film. When film producer S. S. Vasan bought Krishnaswami Subrahmanyam's MPPC Studio and renamed it Gemini Studios in 1940, Sundari Bai joined Gemini as staff artiste. She appeared in a major role in Gemini's first Tamil production Madanakamarajan (1941). She played a slum girl in Nandanar (1942), while her role as a maid in Dasi Aparanji (1944) elevated her fame. She later fell in love with Kothamangalam Subbu, another member of the Gemini staff who was a writer, actor, and director, and married him. In 1945, Sundari Bai played the lead in Kannamma En Kadhali, a World War II film written by Subbu. In 1947, Gemini produced the critically acclaimed but commercially unsuccessful Miss Malini, written and directed by Subbu, who also played the male lead. Sundari Bai acted and sang two songs in this film that became hits. She later went on to act in various films including Chandralekha, Samsaram, Moondru Pillaigal, Avvaiyar, Valliyin Selvan, Enga Veettu Mahalakshmi, Vanjikottai Valiban, Deivapiravi, Naan Kanda Sorgam, Padikkadha Medhai, Paadhai Theriyudhu Paar and Sila Nerangalil Sila Manithargal.

Filmography
 Madanakamarajan (1941)
 Nandanar (1942)
 Dasi Aparanji (1944)
 Kannamma En Kadhali (1945) 
 Miss Malini (1947)
 Chandralekha (1948)
 Moondru Pillaigal (1952)
 Mr. Sampat (1952)
 Avvaiyyar (1953)
 Valliyin Selvan (1955)
 Bommai Kalyanam (1958)
 Vanjikottai Valiban (1958)
 Paththarai Maathu Thangam (1959)
 Deivapiravi (1960)
 Padikkadha Medhai (1960) 
 Palum Pazhamum (1961)
 Manithan Maravillai (1962)
 Annai Illam (1963)
 Thulasi Maadam (1963)
 Aandavan Kattalai (1964)
 Motor Sundaram Pillai (1966)
 Selvam (1966)
 Pesum Dheivam (1967)
 Ooty Varai Uravu (1967)
 Galatta Kalyanam (1968)
 En Thambi (1968)
 Jeevanaamsam (1968)
 Kanavan (1968)
 Thirudan (1969)
 Kanmalar (1970)
 Irulum Oliyum (1971)
 Thangaikkaaga (1971)
 Thenum Paalum (1971)
 Uttharavindri Ulle Vaa (1971)
 Pillaiyo Pillai (1972)
 Arangetram (1973)
 Ninaithadhai Mudippavan (1975)
 Sila Nerangalil Sila Manithargal (1976)
 Nizhal Nijamagiradhu (1978)

References

External links
 

1923 births
2006 deaths
Indian film actresses
Actresses in Tamil cinema
20th-century Indian actresses
Actresses from Madurai
Indian female dancers
Dancers from Tamil Nadu
Singers from Tamil Nadu
Musicians from Madurai
Indian women playback singers
20th-century Indian singers
20th-century Indian dancers
20th-century Indian women singers
Women artists from Tamil Nadu